The Sarah Coventry was a women's professional golf tournament on the LPGA Tour from 1976 to 1981. The inaugural event was played in Florida at the Lely Country Club in Naples in February 1976, then moved to northern California and the Round Hill Country Club in Alamo in September for two years, 1977 and 1978.

Tournament names
1976: Sarah Coventry Naples Classic (Florida)
1977–1978: The Sarah Coventry (California)
1979–1981: The Sarah Coventry (New York, included in Wegman's LPGA records)

Winners

Wegmans LPGA
After 1978, the tournament relocated from California to New York and was played at the Locust Hill Country Club near Rochester from 1979 to 1981. In 1979, the tournament recognized the 1976–78 tournaments as its predecessors, and not the Bankers Trust Classic which had been played at Locust Hill in 1977 and 1978. Today however the Wegmans LPGA recognizes the Bankers Trust Classics and not the first three Sarah Coventry events as part of the tournament's history. The change gave Nancy Lopez three wins in the event, as she won the Bankers Trust Classic at Locust Hill in 1978.

See also
Naples Lely Classic, another LPGA Tour event played at Lely Country Club from 1973 to 1975.

References

External links
Round Hill Country Club

Former LPGA Tour events
Golf in California
Golf in Florida
Sports in the San Francisco Bay Area
Recurring sporting events established in 1976
Recurring sporting events disestablished in 1981
1976 establishments in Florida
1981 disestablishments in New York (state)
Women's sports in Florida
Women's sports in California
History of women in New York (state)